Desasevini Grameena Vayanasala, established in 1947, is a grade A public library in Ernakulam District of Kerala State. The library serves as the most important information store and cultural centre of Puliyanam and has a collection of more than 12,000 books on various subjects. Vayanasala has a separate children's group (Balavedi), a students' corner, and a Mahatma Gandhi corner. It has more than 300 reference books in various subjects.

Administration
Apart from revenues from members, the library runs with a government grant of Rs. 20000.00 for purchasing books in a fiscal year of April–March. Other allowances include the librarian allowance of Rs. 18000.00. The library also gets a yearly grant for Students corner, Balavedi (children's group) for buying books and making activities. Around 500 new books are added every year.

The library is housed in its own building made in 1996 with financial and physical help of people around Puliyanam. This new building includes a big reading hall and library. As per the culture of Kerala most people will use reading room for varies dailies and weeklies. Library has more than 1500 active members. Two librarians are working here with two modes of operation. Apart from regular library coming members, the library has a home delivery service, known as Lady books, for women issuing project (vanitha pusthaka vitharana padhadi) newly started by Kerala State Library Council. Vayanasala completed its diamond jubilee of service. Pro. K. Sachidanandan inaugurated the library's jubilee celebration on 4 November 2007. Dr.M leelavathy & N. K. Desam were presented its inaugural function. V T memorial speech and issuing of V T award was conducted at that time. It is Kerala's first local library which has its own library management software built by committee members 2004–07.

Organizing committee
The organizing committee of the library is composed of eleven executive members who serve for four years.

External links

Public libraries in India
Libraries in Kerala
1947 establishments in India
Library buildings completed in 1996
Libraries in Ernakulam
20th-century architecture in India
Libraries established in 1947